Shariman Che Omar (born 25 March 1980) is a Malaysian footballer. He was one of key figure for Kedah FA since joining from President Cup team and earn several call ups for national team selection since his arrival on the local football scene in 2001. With Malaysia, he made his only full international debut against Kuwait in 2006 World Cup qualifier on 17 November 2004.

After several season playing for his hometown team Kedah, and one season with Perlis, he moved for new pasture with DPMM FC and stay with them for one season. With the withdrawal of DPMM FC of Brunei for 2009 season after their deregistration by Sports Bodies in Brunei Darussalam, he returns to Malaysia and signed with Super League outfit, Penang FA. He joined M. Prakash and other players under guidance of then Penang FA head coach, S. Veloo. For the 2010 season, he joined his old team Perlis.

He reunited with S.Veloo when he joined USM FC for their 2011 Malaysia Premier League campaign.

External links
 
 http://www.malaysiansuperleague.com/team_info.asp?t=PL&tid=35

References

1980 births
Living people
Malaysian footballers
Kedah Darul Aman F.C. players
Expatriate footballers in Brunei
Perlis FA players
People from Kedah
Malaysian expatriate footballers
Malaysian expatriate sportspeople in Brunei
Malaysia international footballers
Association football defenders